Le ravissement de Lol V. Stein is a novel written by Marguerite Duras and published in France by Gallimard in 1964. The text was translated by Richard Seaver and published as The Ravishing of Lol Stein in the U.S. by Grove Press in 1966. The text was also translated by Eileen Ellenbogen in the UK as The rapture of Lol V. Stein for Hamish Hamilton in 1967.

Plot
At the beginning of the novel, Lol Stein (her middle initial is omitted in the English translation) is a woman in her thirties. She was born and raised in South Tahla in a bourgeois family and is engaged to Michael Richardson at 19. However, at a ball in the seaside resort of Town Beach, Michael Richardson leaves Lol for Anne-Marie Stretter, an older woman. After a difficult recovery from this shock which marks her for the rest go her life, Lol marries John Bedford, a musician she meets on one of her daily walks. Lol leaves South Tahla with her husband.

Ten years later, with three children, Lol is an established woman with no time for fantasy. She returns with her family to South Tahla and moves into the house she grew up in. Lol goes on her daily walks as she did ten years before. She thinks she recognises Tatiana Karl one day, the friend who consoled her after her breakup with Michael Richardson. The man who accompanies Tatiana makes a deep impression on Lol.

Lol reestablishes her contact with Tatiana and gets to know both her husband and her lover, Jacques Hold. Lol is able to get information from Jacques about events at the ball at T Beach 10 years before. Lol reveals to Jacques her interest in him but forbids him to stay with her instead of Tatiana.

Lol spies on Tatiana and her lover but Jacques notices her. One day Lol tells Jacques that she has been to T Beach alone and plans to return with him. While doing this, Lol shows Jacques the room where she and Michael Richardson had split up. Lol and Jacques spend the night together. The next day, Jacques has one last meeting with Tatiana Karl.

The novel is seen through the obsessive eyes of Jacques Hold.

See also 
 Le Monde 100 Books of the Century

Notes

1964 French novels
Novels by Marguerite Duras
Éditions Gallimard books